The 1st Alpini Regiment is an active unit of the Italian Army's mountain infantry speciality, the Alpini, which distinguished itself in combat during World War I and World War II. The unit is based in Turin in Piedmont and operationally assigned to the Alpine Brigade "Taurinense".

History

Formation 
The 1st Alpini Regiment was formed on 1 November 1882. It consisted of three battalions: "Alto Tanaro", Val Tanaro and Val Camonica, named after the valleys and localities from which the battalion's soldiers were recruited. In 1886 the battalions were renamed, taking their new names from the location of their logistic depot: Ceva, Pieve di Teco and Mondovì.

World War I 

During World War I the regiment consisted of nine battalions and saw heavy fighting in the Alps regions of the Italian front against Austro-Hungarian and German forces. During the war the regiment consisted of the following battalions (pre-war battalions in bold, followed by their first and second line reserve battalions):

  Ceva, Val Tanaro, Monte Mercantour
  Pieve di Teco, Val Arroscia, Monte Saccarello
  Mondovi, Val d'Ellero, Monte Clapier

During the war a total of 1,200 officers and 40,000 soldiers served in the 1st Alpini Regiment, of which 175 officers and 4,126 soldiers were killed, and 390 officers and 10,805 soldiers were wounded. The regiment's battalions were awarded three Silver Medals of Military Valour during the war, one of which was shared between the Ceva and Monte Saccarello battalions.

Interwar years 

On 31 October 1935, the 4th Alpine Division “Cuneense” was formed. The division consisted of the 1st Alpini Regiment, 2nd Alpini Regiment and 4th Mountain Artillery Regiment.
Each Alpini regiment fielded 160 officers, and 5,046 NCOs and soldiers for a total strength of 5,206 men. Each regiment also had 23 horses, 1,242 mules and 109 transport vehicles at its disposal. The division's order of battle was as follows:

  1st Alpini Regiment, in Mondovì
 Command Company, in Mondovì
  Ceva Alpini Battalion, in Ceva
 1st Alpini Company, in Ceva
 4th Alpini Company, in Bagnasco
 5th Alpini Company, in Ceva
 101st Support Arms Company, in Ceva
  Pieve di Teco Alpini Battalion, in Chiusa di Pesio
 2nd Alpini Company, in Chiusa di Pesio
 3rd Alpini Company, in Chiusa di Pesio
 8th Alpini Company, in Roccaforte Mondovì
 102nd Support Arms Company, in Chiusa di Pesio
  Mondovì Alpini Battalion, in Mondovì
 9th Alpini Company, in Torre Mondovì
 10th Alpini Company, in San Michele Mondovì
 11th Alpini Company, in Vicoforte
 103rd Support Arms Company, in Santuario di Vicoforte
 84th 47/32 M35 Cannon Company, in Mondovì
 1st Health Company, in Mondovì
 612th Field Hospital, in Mondovì
 1st Sanitary Support Company, in Beinette
 21st Baggage Train Company, in Mondovì

In 1935 the "Pieve di Teco" battalion fought in the Second Italo-Abyssinian War, where it distinguished itself during the battles of Amba Aradam, Amba Alagi, Worq Amba, Mai Ceu and Mekan Pass.

World War II 

On 21 June 1940 (one day before the French surrender) the Cuneense began to advance with other Italian units into Southern France. After the French surrender the division was then sent to Albania, where it participated in the Italian attack on Greece. When the German Wehrmacht came to the aid of the beaten Italian armies in Albania in April 1941 through an invasion of Yugoslavia the Cuneense was sent to northern Albania to advance towards the rapidly advancing German divisions. The Cuneense advanced through Montenegro and  reached Dubrovnik by the end of the campaign.

In September 1942 the Cuneense was sent with the 2nd Alpine Division "Tridentina", 3rd Alpine Division "Julia" and other Italian units to the Soviet Union to form the Italian Army in Russia ( abbreviated as ARMIR) and fight alongside the German Wehrmacht against the Red Army. Taking up positions along the Don River, the Italian units covered part of the left flank of the German Sixth Army, which spearheaded the German summer offensive of 1942 into the city of Stalingrad.

After successfully encircling the German Sixth army in Stalingrad the Red Army's attention turned to the Italian units along the Don. On 14 January 1943, the Soviet Operation Little Saturn began and the three alpine division found themselves quickly encircled by rapidly advancing armored Soviet Forces. The Alpini held the front on the Don, but within three days the Soviets had advanced 200 km to the left and right of the Alpini. On the evening of 17 January the commanding officer of the Italian Mountain Corps General Gabriele Nasci ordered a full retreat. At this point the Julia and Cuneense divisions were already heavily decimated and only the Tridentina division was still capable of conducting combat operations. As the Soviets had already occupied every village bitter battles had to be fought to clear the way out of the encirclement. By morning of 28 January the men of the 1st Alpini Regiment had walked 200 km, fought in 20 battles and spent 11 nights camped out in the middle of the Steppe. Temperatures during the nights were between -30 °C and -40 °C. In the course of that day, the last remnants of the regiment were annihilated by Cossack forces. The last survivors of the 1st Alpini Regiment burnt the regimental flag to prevent it from falling in enemy hands, at which point the regiment ceased to exist.

On 11 February 1943, the survivors were counted and out of 5,206 men of the 1st Alpini Regiment just 722 had reached Axis lines; none of the soldiers of the battalions Ceva, Pieve di Teco and Mondovì had made it out of the Soviet encirclement. 3,475 men of the 1st Alpini Regiment died in Russia.
The survivors were repatriated and after the signing of the Italian armistice with the Allies on 8 September 1943, the regiment was formally dissolved.

Cold War 
The 1st Alpini Regiment was reformed on 23 November 1945, but as the unit had burned its war flag and thus lost its regimental colors, the regiment was disbanded again on 15 April 1946.

Alpini Battalion "Mondovì" 

During the 1975 army reform the army disbanded the regimental level and newly independent battalions were given for the first time their own flags. In preparation of the reform the 2nd Alpini Regiment (Recruits Training) was disbanded on 31 October 1974 and the regiment's Alpini Battalion "Orobica" (Recruits Training) in Cuneo was renamed as Alpini Battalion "Mondovì" (Recruits Training). The Mondovì was given the traditions of the 1st Alpini Regiment and received a new flag. The battalion was assigned to the Alpine Brigade "Taurinense" and remained active until 30 August 1997.

When the battalion was disbanded it had the following structure:

  Alpini Battalion "Mondovì"
  Command and Services Company
  9th Alpini Company
  10th Alpini Company
  11th Alpini Company
  103rd Alpini Company

2022 Reactivation 
On 4 October 2022 the flag and traditions of the 1st Alpini Regiment were given to the Command and Tactical Supports Unit "Taurinense" of the Alpine Brigade "Taurinense".

As of reactivation the unit is organized as follows:

  1st Alpini Command and Tactical Supports Unit, in Turin
 Command Company
 Signal Company

Military honors 
After World War II the President of Italy awarded the 1st Alpini Regiment Italy's highest military honor, the Gold Medal of Military Valour for the regiment's conduct and sacrifice during the Italian campaign on the Eastern Front:

  Italian campaign on the Eastern Front, awarded 3 March 1949

External links
 1st Alpini Regiment on vecio.it

Sources 
 Franco dell'Uomo, Rodolfo Puletti: L'Esercito Italiano verso il 2000 - Volume Primo - Tomo I, Rome 1998, Stato Maggiore dell'Esercito - Ufficio Storico, page: 451

References 

Alpini regiments of Italy
Regiments of Italy in World War I
Regiments of Italy in World War II
Military units and formations established in 1882
Military units and formations disestablished in 1943
Military units and formations established in 1945
Military units and formations disestablished in 1946